Kabelo Petrus Motha (born November 27, 1992) is a South African DJ and record producer, popularly known as Kabza De Small. He is a major figure in the amapiano genre of house music. Aside from  his solo career, Motha is a member of the Scorpion Kings. Motha gained international recognition  after the release of "Umshove", in 2018.

Kabza's fourth studio album  I Am the King of Amapiano: Sweet & Dust (2021), debuted number one in South Africa.

Forbes Africa ranked Motha number 18 on Forbes Africa 30 under 30. His accolades include six South African Music Awards, two Mzansi Viewers Choice Awards, three AmaPiano Music Awards and one Sunday Times GenNext.

Life and career  
Born and raised in  Mpumalanga, later Motha family relocated to Pretoria. His musical career began in 2009. He was signed under Tyrique de 
Bruyne and released his first album Avenuee Sound in 2016 under Bestbyfar Records, Kabza established his own record label PianoHub. His breakthrough single "Umshove" featuring South African singer Leehleza was released in 2018. On 1 October 2019, he released Piano Hub with DJ Maphorisa.  The Extended play was certified 3× platinum in South Africa. The Return of Scorpion Kings was released on 29 November 2019.

On 31 January 2020, Scorpion Kings (Kabza de Small and DJ Maphorisa) announced Scorpion King Live, which was set to be 11 April, at Sun Arena, Times Square in Pretoria. The concert was postponed due to the COVID-19 outbreak, and was rescheduled to 9 August.

His studio album I Am the King of Amapiano: Sweet & Dust, was released on 26 June 2020. The album was certified double platinum in South Africa. In December 2020, Kabza was listed  as the most streamed South African artist by Spotify. That same month, Kabza announced collaborative studio album Rumble in the Jungle, and released lead single "Funu", featuring Afro-pop singer Tresor in February 2021. Rumble in the Jungle, a collaborative studio album by Kabza de Small, DJ Maphorisa, and Tresor was released on 9 April 2021.

Motha was ranked at number 18 on Forbes Africa 30 under 30 list in June 2021.

In July 2021, he was featured on Rolling Stone magazine for his musical career.

On 27 September, Kabza and DJ Maphorisa released "Abalele" featuring South African singer Ami Faku. The song debuted number 4 on the Spotify charts and number 1 on the official South African Music Charts.

In early January 2022, he announced his upcoming album KOA II Part 1, on his Instagram account. The album was set to be released on 16 June 2022.

His studio EP Ziwangale was released on 22 April 2022. Its lead single "Ziwa Ngale" featuring  DJ Tira, DJ Exit SA, Beast, Mshunqisi, Young Stunna, and Felo Le Tee, charted number on iTune SA music charts.

The other three songs, "Ebusuku" featuring Nkosazana Daughter, "Kabza" featuring Murumba Pitch, and "Mak'shoni" Langa" featuring DJ Maphorisa, Murumba Pitch, and Da Muziqal Chef, debuted at number 7, number 12 and number 26 respectively, on iTunes music chart.

On 31 May, Kabza released 6 singles; "Khusela" featuring Msaki, "Bathini" featuring Young Stunna and Artwork Sounds, and "Isoka" featuring Nkosazana Daughter and Murumba Pitch, as part 1 of  his album.

KOA II Part 1 (pronounced King of Amapiano 2 Part 1) was released on 16 June 2022.

The album debuted number 11 on iTunes top 100 chart, and "Khusela" peaked  number 1 on Apple Music charts.

In June 2022, Motha announced 3 leg tour that ran from 24 to 26 June.

In early October 2022, he announced working on his upcoming EP via Twitter, and released a lead single "K'shubile" with Kwesta featuring Masterpiece YVK. In November 2022, he worked with Afrika Memani on the Road To Private EP, which was released on the 4th of November.

Scorpion Kings announced Summer Tour which includes 9 dates, it will run from 11 December at Cape Town until 25 February 2023, Gauteng.

Kabza reportedly working on joint extended play together with Ami Faku, announced on his Twitter account on 13 February 2023. Release date and EP title are yet to be announced.

Awards and nominations

All Africa Music Awards 

! 
|-
|rowspan="3"|2022
|"Adiwele"
|African Fans Favourite
|
|rowspan="3"|
|-
|KOA II
|Album of the Year
|
|-
|Himself 
|Artist of the Year
|

DStv Mzansi Viewers' Choice Awards 

!
|-
| rowspan="3"| 2020
| "Nana Thula"
| Favourite Song of the Year
| 
| rowspan="3"|
|-
| rowspan="2"|Himself 
| Favourite Rising Star 
| 
|-
|Favourite DJ
|
|-
| rowspan="3"| 2022
| "Asibe Happy"
| Favourite Song 
| 
| rowspan="3"|
|-
| rowspan="2"|Scorpion Kings (Kabza de Small and DJ Maphorisa)
|Favourite music artist/group
|
|-
|Favourite DJ
|

South African Amapiano Music Awards 

!
|-
|rowspan="4"|2021
| Scorpion Kings Live
|Amapiano Album of the Year
|
|rowspan="4"|
|-
| Scorpion Kings 
|Best Amapiano Male DJ Act
|
|-
|Himself 
|Best Amapiano Music Producer
|
|-
|"Emcimbini"
|Best Amapiano Collaboration
|
|-
|rowspan=9|2023
|"Abalele"
|rowspan=3|Song of the Year
|
|rowspan=9|
|-
|"Asibe Happy"
|
|-
|rowspan=3|Khusela" featuring Msaki
|
|-
|Best AmaPiano Produced Song
| 
|-
|rowspan=2|Best Amapiano Collaboration 
| 
|-
|"Asibe Happy" 
| 
|-
|KOA II Part 1
|Best AmaPiano Album/Ep
|
|-
|rowspan=2|Himself
|Best AmaPiano Producer
|
|-
|AmaPiano Artist of the Year 
|

South African Music Awards 

!
|-
| rowspan="3"|2020
| rowspan="2"|Scorpion Kings (DJ Maphorisa, Kabza De Small, MFR Souls & Virgo Deep)
| Album of the Year
| 
| rowspan="3"|
|-
|-
|rowspan="2"|Best Kwaito/Gqom/Amapiano
|
|-
| The Return of the Scorpion Kings (Kabza De Small and DJ Maphorisa)
| 
|-
|rowspan="6"|2021
|Once Upon A Time in Lockdown – Kabza De Small & DJ Maphorisa (Scorpion Kings)
|rowspan="2"|Album of the year
|
|rowspan="6"| 
|-
|rowspan="2"|I Am The King of Amapiano: Sweet & Dust
|
|-
|Male Artist of the Year
|
|-
|rowspan="2"|Once Upon A Time in Lockdown (Scorpion Kings)
|Duo/Group of the Year
|
|-
|rowspan="2"|Best Amapiano Album
|
|-
|I Am The King of Amapiano: Sweet & Dust
|
|-
|rowspan="3"|2022
|"Asibe Happy" 
|rowspan="2"|Record of the Year 
|
|rowspan="2"|
|-
|rowspan=2|"Abalele"
|
|-
|Most Streamed Song of the Year
| 
|

Sunday Times GenNext 

!
|-
|2021
|Himself 
|Coolest Local Club In countrys DJ
|
|

Mzansi Kwaito and House Music Awards 

!
|-
| 2021
| "Emcimbini"
| Most Voted Song
| 
|

Discography

Studio albums 
Avenue Sound (2016)
Pretty Girls Love Amapiano (2019)
Pretty Girls Love Amapiano 2 (2020)
 I Am the King of Amapiano: Sweet & Dust (2020)
 KOA II Part 1 (2022)

Collaborative albums 

Scorpion Kings EP  (2019)
Piano Hub EP  (2019)
 The Return of the Scorpion Kings  (2019)
Scorpion Kings Live At Sun Arena  (2020)
Once Upon A Time In A Lockdown  (2020)
Petle Petle EP  & King Deetoy) (2021)
 Rumble in the Jungle  (2021)
Pretty Girls Love Amapiano 3 (with Mdu aka Trp) (2021)Scorpion Kings Live Sun Arena  (2022)
 Speak N Vrostaan (with Kwesta) (2022)

 EPs 
 Ziwangale EP'' (2022)

References

External links 
 

South African DJs
South African musicians
Amapiano musicians
Living people
21st-century South African musicians
1992 births